Dinhata Assembly constituency is an assembly constituency in Cooch Behar district in the Indian state of West Bengal.

Overview
As per orders of the Delimitation Commission, No. 7 Dinhata Assembly constituency covers Dinhata municipality, Dinhata II community development block, and Bhetaguri I, Dinhata Gram I, Dinhata Gram II and Putimari I gram panchayats of Dinhata I community development block.

Dinhata Assembly constituency is part of No. 1 Cooch Behar (Lok Sabha constituency) (SC).

Members of Legislative Assembly

^: by-elections

Election results

2021 Bye election

2021

2016
Udayan Guha, the Forward Bloc MLA from Dinhata, Joined Trinamool Congress on 1 October 2015.
In the 2016 election, Udayan Guha of Trinamool Congress defeated his nearest rival Akshay Thakur of All India Forward Bloc.

2011
Udayan Guha, the Forward Bloc MLA from Dinhata, joined Trinamool Congress on 1 October 2015.

.
In the 2011 election, Udayan Guha of AIFB defeated his nearest rival Dr. Md Fazle Haque Independent.

The outgoing Trinamool Congress MLA, Ashok Mondal, was publicly expelled by Mamata Banerjee for campaigning for Dr. Md. Fazle Haque, dissident Congress leader and MLA from Sitai.
Dr. Md. Fazle Haque, contesting as an Independent Candidate, was a rebel congress leader.

 Nationalist Congress Party did not contest this seat in 2006.

2006
In the 2006 election, Ashok Mondal of AITC defeated his nearest rival Udayan Guha of AIFB

2001
In the 2001 election, Kamal Guha of AIFB defeated his nearest rival Dipak Sengupta of AITC

1972-2006
In the 2006 state assembly elections, Ashok Mandal of Trinamool Congress won the Dinhata seat defeating his nearest rival Udayan Guha of Forward Bloc. Contests in most years were multi cornered but only winners and runners are being mentioned. Kamal Guha won the seat in a row from 1977 to 2001 (and also earlier – see below). He represented Forward Bloc in all years except 1996, when he represented the break away Forward Bloc (Socialist), which subsequently was reunited with the parent body. He defeated Dipak Sengupta representing Trinamool Congress in 2001 and representing Forward Bloc in 1996, Alok Nandi of Congress in 1991 and 1987, Ramkrishna Pal of Congress in 1982 and Alok Nandy of Congress in 1977.

1951-1972
Jogesh Chandra Sarkar of Congress won the Dinhata seat in 1972 and 1971. Animesh Mukharjee of Congress won it in 1969. Kamal Guha of Forward Bloc won it 1967 and 1962. In 1957 Dinhata was double seat reserved for SC. Bhawani Prasanna Talukdar and Umesh Chandra Mandal (both of Congress) won. In independent India's first election in 1951, Satish Chandra Roy Singha and Umesh Chandra Mandal (both of Congress) won from Dinhata.

References

Assembly constituencies of West Bengal
Politics of Cooch Behar district